John Shebat (born February 17, 1997) is an American competition swimmer who specializes in backstroke, medley, and butterfly events. He is a gold medalist in the 4×100-meter medley relay from the 2019 World University Games in Naples, swimming the butterfly leg.

Shebat competed for the University of Texas at Austin from 2015 to 2019 where he was a 5-time NCAA champion, 3-time NCAA team champion, a 16-time All American, and the 2019 Big 12 Men's Swimmer of the Year. He is also an incumbent NCAA and U.S. Open record-holder in the 4×50-yard and 4×100-yard medley relays. As a professional swimmer, Shebat represented the Cali Condors in the International Swimming League's inaugural 2019 season.

Personal bests

See also
 NCAA Division I Men's Swimming and Diving Championships
 List of University of Texas at Austin alumni
 Texas Longhorns swimming and diving
 Texas Longhorns

References

1997 births
Living people
American male swimmers
American male backstroke swimmers
American male medley swimmers
American male butterfly swimmers
Universiade medalists in swimming
Universiade gold medalists for the United States
Medalists at the 2019 Summer Universiade
Texas Longhorns men's swimmers
21st-century American people